Oceano County Airport  is a public airport located one mile (1.6 km) west of the central business district (CBD) of Oceano, in San Luis Obispo County, California, United States. It is mostly used for general aviation, and is walking distance to the sand dunes that line the beach at Oceano.

References

External links 

Airports in San Luis Obispo County, California